Qullar (also, Gullar) is a village and municipality in the Barda District of Azerbaijan. As of 2008, it was said to have a population of 520.

References

Populated places in Barda District